The 1912 Montana football team represented the University of Montana in the 1912 college football season. They were led by first-year head coach Wallace Philoon, played their home games at Dornblaser Field and finished the season with a record of four wins and three losses (4–3).

Schedule

References

Montana
Montana Grizzlies football seasons
Montana football